Fourche Junction is an unincorporated community in Perry County, Arkansas, United States.

References

Unincorporated communities in Perry County, Arkansas
Unincorporated communities in Arkansas